The 1993 Alberta general election was held on June 15, 1993, to elect members of the Legislative Assembly of Alberta. The Conservative government was re-elected, taking 51 seats out of 83 (61 percent of the seats) but only having support of 45 percent of voters.

It is notable because it was seen by some as a contest between the former mayors of Calgary and Edmonton, Ralph Klein and Laurence Decore, respectively.

Until the government's defeat in 2015, this election was the closest the Progressive Conservatives came to losing since coming to power in 1971.

Background
In 1992, the Liberal Party was led by Laurence Decore, a former mayor of Edmonton. Despite being the smallest of the three parties in the legislature, the Liberals made major gains by shifting to the political right and criticizing the Conservatives' fiscal responsibility, the province's rapidly rising debt, and the government's involvement in the private sector which resulted in some companies defaulting on government loans.

In September 1992, Don Getty resigned as provincial premier and leader of the Progressive Conservative Party, after polls showed that he would not win re-election. The party membership elected Environment Minister and former Calgary mayor Ralph Klein to succeed Getty. Klein campaigned for the leadership in part by making arguments similar to Decore's. He favoured a near-immediate balancing of the provincial budget and rapid debt repayment thereafter, and declared his government "out of the business of business". By the time Klein dropped the writs, his party had regained the lead on polls.

The election was fought on a new series of electoral boundaries based on the census of 1991, drawn by a committee composed only of Progressive Conservative MLAs led by Bob Bogle, with no input from opposition parties. The new electoral map drew criticism from the Alberta Court of Appeal in 1994 because the committee gave no justification for creating four districts well below average population, one of which was Bogle's own riding of Taber-Warner.

Campaign
During the general election campaign, Klein promoted the significant changes that he had made during his time of Premier, distancing the Conservatives from Getty's past administration. Decore, facing a Premier with whom he agreed on many issues, argued that the Progressive Conservative party had no moral authority left on the issues on which Klein was campaigning.

There were several televised debates, however viewership was low since it coincided with the 1993 Stanley Cup Finals.

Election
Klein's efforts were seen as successful in reinvigorating the Conservatives from certain defeat just under a year earlier. Ending up, they retained a solid majority in the legislature for its seventh consecutive term in government. The Conservatives actually managed to increase their share of the popular vote marginally, although they lost eight seats in the legislature since the vote was not as evenly split as it had been four years ago. Notably, the PC's were shut out of Edmonton for the first time since 1963, but managed to make gains in Klein's hometown of Calgary where they won all but three seats.

The Liberals capitalized on the stagnant PC vote and the collapse of the New Democratic Party vote from 26% to 11%.  As opposition to the PC government coalesced around Decore and the Liberals, they won almost 40% of the popular vote and 32 seats in the legislature, including every seat in Edmonton. They formed what still stands as the largest opposition caucus in Alberta history with the exception of 1917, when the government majority was smaller but there were far fewer seats in the legislature. To the surprise of many, Decore stepped down as Liberal leader not long after the election, supposedly being pressured to resign by party insiders who felt that he had missed the party's best chance in over 70 years to form government.

Ray Martin's New Democrats, previously the official opposition, were shut out of the legislature altogether for the first time since 1967. All of their seats in Edmonton—including Martin's--were lost to the Liberals, due to the popularity of Decore there. Martin suggested that tactical voting was to blame as well, as the anti-PC vote consolidated around the Liberals.

Results
Overall voter turnout was 60.21%.

Overall results

Detailed results

Notes:

* Party did not nominate candidates in the previous election.

x – less than 0.005% of the popular vote

Results by riding

|-
|Athabasca-Wabasca|||
|Mike Cardinal4,14459.72%
|
|Simon Waquan1,92127.68%
|
|Emil Zachkewich84312.15%
|
|
|
|
||
|New riding
|-
|Banff-Cochrane|||
|Brian Evans6,55252.43%
|
|Paula Andrews4,18333.47%
|
|Cindy McCallum1,0488.39%
|
|
|
|Brian L. Horejsi (Ind.)6074.86%Ginger (V.M.) Sheets-Revitt (Nat. Law)770.62%
||
|Brian Evans
|-
|Barrhead-Westlock|||
|Kenneth R. Kowalski6,31254.92%
|
|Dale Greig3,30928.79%
|
|Harold E. Wharton1,0769.36%
|
|Dale W. Harris5614.88%
|
|Adam Hauch (C.o.R.)1431.25%Leonard Stahl (Ind.)670.58%
||
|
|-
|Bonnyville
|
|Ernie Isley4,22245.44%|||
|Leo Vasseur4,36446.97%
|
|Agathe Gaulin6667.17%
|
|
|
||||
|Ernie Isley
|-
|Bow Valley|||
|Lyle Oberg5,40361.13%
|
|Peter Hansen2,42427.43%
|
|Richard Knutson5586.31%
|
|Reuban Huber4364.93%
|
||||
|Tom N. Musgrove
|-
|Calgary-Bow|||
|Bonnie Laing7,01146.10%
|
|Rob Van Walleghem5,36935.30%
|
|Anne McGrath1,90812.55%
|
|Patrick John Hudson3762.47%
|
|David Crowe (Green)2871.89%Roberta McDonald (C.o.R.)1200.79%Alan Livingston (Nat. Law)780.51%|||
|Bonnie Laing
|-
|Calgary-Buffalo
|
|Steven Yu4,31340.41%|||
|Gary Dickson4,82645.22%
|
|Israel Lachovsky1,0629.95%
|
|
|
|Rebecca Matiowsky (Green)2122.00%Ralph Holt (Nat. Law)1851.73%
||
|Gary Dickson
|-
|Calgary-Cross|||
|Yvonne Fritz6,44959.56%
|
|Keith Hart3,57633.03%
|
|Vinay Dey6866.34%
|
|
|
|Neeraj Varma (Nat. Law)860.79%|||
|
|-
|Calgary-Currie|||
|Jocelyn Burgener6,69947.72%
|
|Mairi Matheson4,67033.26%
|
|Ilona Boyce1,42610.16%
|
|
|
|Mark Waters (All.)1,2008.57%
||
|Dennis L. Anderson
|-
|Calgary-East|||
|Moe Amery5,50354.30%
|
|Dale Muti1,68916.67%
|
|Barry Pashak2,30622.75%
|
|Lera G. Shirley3663.61%
|
|Alain Horchower (Ind.)2372.34%|||
|
|-
|Calgary-Egmont|||
|Denis Herard9,84657.94%
|
|Dick Nichols5,33231.38%
|
|Ken Sahil1,0636.26%
|
|
|
|Les Kaluzny (All.)5433.21%Linda Fritz (Nat. Law)1560.92%
||
|David John Carter
|-
|Calgary-Elbow|||
|Ralph Klein10,06157.94%
|
|Madeleine King6,14235.37%
|
|Eileen Clancy Teslenko6173.55%
|
|Steve Tobler3121.80%
|
|Miel S.R. Gabriel (Ind.)1010.58%Bruce Hansen (Nat. Law)850.49%|||
|Ralph Klein
|-
|Calgary-Fish Creek|||
|Heather Forsyth7,85554.58%
|
|Marie Cameron5,34637.15%
|
|Kerin Spaargaren5583.88%
|
|
|
|Roy Carey (Ind.)5443.78%Darlene Holt (Nat. Law)700.49%|||
|William Edward Payne
|-
|Calgary-Foothills|||
|Patricia Black8,12952.71%
|
|Frances Wright6,14639.85%
|
|Don McMillan9656.26%
|
|
|
|Anna Novikov (Nat. Law)1551.01%|||
|Patricia Black
|-
|Calgary-Glenmore|||
|Dianne Mirosh7,97248.54%
|
|Brendan Dunphy7,06443.01%
|
|Noreen Murphy6033.67%
|
|Stuart van der Lee5453.32%
|
|Sol Candel (Green)1470.90%John Vrskovy (Nat. Law)610.37%
||
|Dianne Mirosh
|-
|Calgary-Lougheed|||
|Jim Dinning7,28052.70%
|
|Jack Driscoll5,80342.01%
|
|Catherine Rose5023.63%
|
|
|
|Peter Hope (C.o.R.)1220.88%Ida Bugmann (Nat. Law)880.64%|||
|
|-
|Calgary-McCall|||
|Harry Sohal4,11844.69%
|
|A. Giga2,92131.70%
|
|Sylvia Lilley9009.77%
|
|
|
|Brian R. Newman (Ind.)1,06611.57%Allen Maclennan (C.o.R.)1291.41%Maureen Doram (Nat. Law)550.60%|||
|Stanley Kenneth Nelson
|-
|Calgary-Montrose|||
|Hung Pham4,86648.01%
|
|Keong Yap2,59225.57%
|
|Jean Munn1,97019.44%
|
|
|
|Blaine Desjardine (Ind.)6136.05%Chris Deluce (Nat. Law)680.67%|||
|Rick Orman
|-
|Calgary-Mountain View|||
|Mark Hlady5,76846.07%
|
|Jonathan Horlick2,79122.29%
|
|Robert Andrew Hawkesworth3,25526.00%
|
|George Clark4813.84%
|
|Bruce Jackman (C.o.R.)1160.93%Alberta Scraba (Nat. Law)710.57%
||
|Robert Andrew Hawkesworth
|-
|Calgary-North Hill|||
|Richard Charles Magnus6,75649.87%
|
|Tom Dixon4,26231.46%
|
|Wendy Charlton1,93514.28%
|
|
|
|Michael O'Malley (Ind.)3942.91%Joyce Gregson (Nat. Law)1601.18%|||
|Frederick Alan Stewart
|-
|Calgary-North West
|
|Harley Torgerson6,44345.37%|||
|Frank Bruseker6,76347.62%
|
|Paul George Rasporich4953.49%
|
|David Grant3732.63%
|
|Paul Colver (Nat. Law)1100.77%|||
|Frank Bruseker
|-
|Calgary-Nose Creek|||
|Gary Mar6,97453.53%
|
|Yolande Gagnon5,05738.81%
|
|Albert Sole7896.06%
|
|
|
|Ray Harris (Nat. Law)1761.35%|||
|
|-
|Calgary-Shaw|||
|Jonathan Niles Havelock9,32862.24%
|
|Bill Walker4,96333.11%
|
|Jason Ness5263.51%
|
|
|
|Ken Nielsen (Nat. Law)1360.91%|||
|Jim Dinning
|-
|Calgary-Varsity|||
|Murray D. Smith8,52047.75%
|
|Carrol Jaques6,86038.45%
|
|Sharon Kimmel1,78510.00%
|
|
|
|Mike Sawyer (Green)5312.98%Santo Esposito (Nat. Law)990.55%
||
|
|-
|Calgary-West
|
|Ron Leigh6,53244.29%|||
|Danny Dalla-Longa6,92746.97%
|
|Nabil (Ben) Hantes5843.96%
|
|Sharon Whitehead5483.72%
|
|Phil Morin (Nat. Law)1350.92%|||
|Elaine McCoy
|-
|Cardston-Chief Mountain|||
|Jack Ady3,34569.05%
|
|Bruce A. Jackson1,32627.37%
|
|Larry Zima1633.36%
|
|
|
||||
|
|-
|Chinook|||
|Shirley McClellan4,74864.85%
|
|Dianne Anderson1,01513.86%
|
|Steven Milner2233.05%
|
|Gus Mattheis1,02514.00%
|
|Kristopher Dietrich (Ind.)2934.00%|||
|Shirley McClellan
|-
|Clover Bar-Fort Saskatchewan
|
|Rob Splane4,81635.97%|||
|Muriel Abdurahman5,61241.91%
|
|W.H. (Skip) Gordon2,07215.47%
|
|
|
|Kurt Gesell (Ind.)8726.51%|||
|
|-
|Cypress-Medicine Hat|||
|Lorne Taylor4,03449.11%
|
|Lloyd B. Robinson2,79934.07%
|
|James Ridley4946.01%
|
|Al Strom85510.41%
|
||||
|
|-
|Drayton Valley-Calmar|||
|Tom Thurber5,26150.98%
|
|Brad Janishewski3,00129.08%
|
|Dolly Brown7687.44%
|
|Ed White1,13310.98%
|
|Keith Burger (Nat. Law)1381.34%|||
|
|-
|Drumheller|||
|Stan Schumacher7,42162.76%
|
|Roger Nelson2,45720.78%
|
|Steve Osborne1,46312.37%
|
|
|
|David McAndrews (C.o.R.)4543.85%
||
|Stan Schumacher
|-
|Dunvegan|||
|Glen Clegg4,65045.89%
|
|Hartmann Nagel4,34742.90%
|
|Sheila Maxwell-Marks1,10010.86%
|
|
|
||||
|Glen Clegg
|-
|Edmonton-Avonmore
|
|Ken Alyuila3,43326.82%|||
|Gene Zwozdesky6,72852.56%
|
|Marie Laing2,19017.11%
|
|Leslie M. Jackson2852.23%
|
|Dennis Clark (Green)970.76%Lucia Hoff (Nat. Law)400.31%|||
|Marie Laing
|-
|Edmonton-Beverly-Belmont
|
|Brian Hlus3,06028.68%|||
|Julius E. Yankowsky5,03747.22%
|
|Ed W. Ewasiuk2,47323.18%
|
|
|
|Ria Kinzel (Nat. Law)910.85%|||
|
|-
|Edmonton-Centre
|
|John Wheelwright3,41828.66%|||
|Michael Henry5,65647.43%
|
|Kay Hurtig2,34319.65%
|
|Wes Warren2021.69%
|
|Richard Johnsen (Nat. Law)950.80%|||
|William Roberts
|-
|Edmonton-Ellerslie
|
|Bas Roopnarine2,11620.71%|||
|Debby Carlson5,46653.49%
|
|Gerry Gibeault2,14420.98%
|
|Ken Way3983.90%
|
|Rhonda Day (Nat. Law)790.77%|||
|
|-
|Edmonton-Glengarry
|
|Don Clarke2,66923.28%|||
|Laurence Decore7,54865.84%
|
|Greg Reimer1,0889.49%
|
|
|
|Linda Sikora (Nat. Law)1181.03%|||
|Laurence Decore
|-
|Edmonton-Glenora
|
|Gwen Harris5,15033.31%|||
|Howard Sapers7,74550.10%
|
|Arlene Young1,87412.12%
|
|Trevor Blinston3011.95%
|
|Pat Nelson (C.o.R.) 2311.50%Paula Johnsen (Nat. Law)1220.79%
||
|Nancy Betkowski
|-
|Edmonton-Gold Bar
|
|John Szumlas4,72126.30%|||
|Bettie Hewes10,60559.07%
|
|Lorraine Crawford1,82010.14%
|
|David H. Friesen5162.87%
|
|David J. Parker (Green)1650.92%Roni Shapka (Nat. Law)900.50%
||
|Bettie Hewes
|-
|Edmonton-Highlands-Beverly
|
|Ron Liepert2,78724.42%|||
|Alice Hanson5,18945.46%
|
|John McInnis2,88525.28%
|
|Tim Friesen4283.75%
|
|Cliff Kinzel (Nat. Law)940.82%|||
|
|-
|Edmonton-Manning
|
|Tony Kallal2,52121.45%|||
|Peter Sekulic6,00751.11%
|
|Thomas Sigurdson2,90424.71%
|
|George Grant2962.52%
|
||||
|
|-
|Edmonton-Mayfield
|
|Lynn Faulder3,63526.90%|||
|Lance D. White6,49548.06%
|
|Alex McEachern3,17323.48%
|
|
|
|Annie Anderson (Nat. Law)1811.34%|||
|
|-
|Edmonton-McClung
|
|Henry Mah4,17729.69%|||
|Grant Mitchell8,93163.48%
|
|Denis Gautier-Villon7995.68%
|
|
|
|Pat Simpson (Nat. Law)1250.89%|||
|
|-
|Edmonton-Meadowlark
|
|Laurie Pushor3,97831.10%|||
|Karen Leibovici7,21556.40%
|
|William A. (Bill) Mullen1,1118.68%
|
|Norm Case3542.77%
|
|Margo Cochlan (Nat. Law)1100.86%|||
|Grant Mitchell
|-
|Edmonton-Mill Woods
|
|W. Bill Pidruchney2,55626.85%|||
|Don Massey5,33055.98%
|
|Laat Bhinder1,00710.58%
|
|Robert J. Alford4144.35%
|
|Ken Kozak (Ind.)1021.07%Raymond Boyko (Green)460.48%Mary D. Romach (Nat. Law)440.46%|||
|Gerry Gibeault
|-
|Edmonton-Norwood
|
|Fay Orr2,51721.68%|||
|Andrew Beniuk4,94442.58%
|
|Ray Martin3,74932.29%
|
|Alan Cruikshank2642.27%
|
|Maury Shapka (Nat. Law)880.76%|||
|Ray Martin
|-
|Edmonton-Roper
|
|John Belzerowski2,82825.30%|||
|Sine Chadi5,87252.53%
|
|Christie Mjolsness2,36221.13%
|
|
|
|Allan Gwynn (Nat. Law)950.85%|||
|
|-
|Edmonton-Rutherford
|
|Brenda Platzer4,28329.77%|||
|Percy Wickman8,58359.65%
|
|Olive Dickason9696.73%
|
|David Wozney3982.77%
|
|Wade McKinley (Nat. Law)660.46%Myles Evely (Green)640.44%
||
|
|-
|Edmonton-Strathcona
|
|Don Grimble4,07124.43%|||
|Al Zariwny6,54239.26%
|
|Barrie Chivers5,12130.73%
|
|Patrick D. Ellis4602.76%
|
|Elizabeth Paschen (Green)2531.52%E. Benjamin Toane (Nat. Law)1080.65%Naomi J. Rankin (Comm.)470.28%
||
|Gordon S.B. Wright/Barrie Chivers (1991-)
|-
|Edmonton-Whitemud
|
|David Hancock5,35136.18%|||
|Mike Percy8,62858.34%
|
|Daniel Aitken6484.38%
|
|
|
|Robert Wilde (Green)730.49%Richard Shelford (Nat. Law)630.43%|||
|Percy Wickman
|-
|Fort McMurray
|
|Connie Macrae2,73827.22%|||
|Adam Germain4,26142.36%
|
|Ann Dort-Maclean1,48314.74%
|
|
|
|Wendell Maceachern (Ind.)1,56315.54%|||
|Norman A. Weiss
|-
|Grande Prairie-Smoky|||
|Walter Paszkowski4,94254.97%
|
|John A. Croken2,50627.88%
|
|Christine Potts1,19913.34%
|
|
|
|Herb Wohlgemuth (C.o.R.)3293.67%
||
|
|-
|Grande Prairie-Wapiti|||
|Wayne Jacques4,45747.89%
|
|Dwight Logan3,94242.36%
|
|Trish Wright8809.46%
|
|
|
||||
|
|-
|Highwood|||
|Don Tannas8,06364.77%
|
|Rusti-Ann Blanke3,15925.38%
|
|Marg Elliot5044.05%
|
|John Bergen7015.63%
|
||||
|Don Tannas
|-
|Innisfail-Sylvan Lake|||
|Gary Severtson5,66053.48%
|
|Daryl J. Beck2,29421.67%
|
|Reg Stotz5445.14%
|
|Norm Bjornson5204.91%
|
|George Flake (Alliance)1,38113.08%Len Scott (Ind.)1631.54%|||
|
|-
|Lac La Biche-St. Paul
|
|John Trefanenko3,89739.11%|||
|Paul Langevin5,04150.59%
|
|Eugene P. Houle99910.03%
|
|
|
||||
|
|-
|Lacombe-Stettler|||
|Judy Gordon6,59657.71%
|
|Ed Whiteside3,00126.26%
|
|Rolf Pritchard7306.39%
|
|R. Ryan Handley6876.01%
|
|Douglas R. Chitwood (Ind.)3973.47%|||
|
|-
|Leduc
|
|Donald H. Sparrow5,88442.87%|||
|Terry Kirkland6,82349.71%
|
|Jeff Lambert8125.92%
|
|
|
|Larry Bogart (Nat. Law)1921.40%|||
|
|-
|Lesser Slave Lake|||
|Pearl M. Calahasen4,26055.30%
|
|Denise C. Wahlstrom3,09340.15%
|
|Larry Sakaluk3264.23%
|
|
|
||||
|Pearl M. Calahasen
|-
|Lethbridge-East
|
|Patricia A. (Pat) Bunn5,09239.86%|||
|Ken Nicol6,11447.86%
|
|Larry Conley1,49511.70%
|
|
|
||||
|Archibald Dick Johnston
|-
|Lethbridge-West|||
|Clint Dunford4,64341.73%
|
|Michael Dietrich4,53440.76%
|
|Jacqueline Preyde9738.75%
|
|
|
|Jason Kempt (Ind.)9268.32%|||
|John Gogo
|-
|Little Bow|||
|Barry McFarland6,70967.07%
|
|Donna L. Graham2,88628.85%
|
|Rod Lachmuth3823.82%
|
|
|
||||
|Raymond Albert Speaker
|-
|Medicine Hat|||
|Rob Renner4,94138.90%
|
|Garth Vallely4,79037.71%
|
|Bob Wanner2,36618.63%
|
|Marcel Guay5684.47%
|
||||
|James Horsman
|-
|Olds-Didsbury|||
|Roy Brassard8,38361.48%
|
|Donna Gole3,37824.77%
|
|Ruth Scott3552.60%
|
|Derry H. Macfarlane8155.98%
|
|Dennis Combs (C.o.R.)6835.02%
||
|Roy Brassard
|-
|Peace River|||
|Gary Friedel3,15643.23%
|
|Elmer Cardinal2,40232.90%
|
|Brian Dewar1,19216.33%
|
|
|
|Ed Kary (C.o.R.)5267.23%
||
|Al (Boomer) Adair
|-
|Pincher Creek-Macleod|||
|David Coutts4,84345.33%
|
|Ernie Patterson4,23139.60%
|
|Mike Dawson9308.70%
|
|
|
|Susan Aris (Ind.)6405.99%|||
|
|-
|Ponoka-Rimbey|||
|Halvar C. Jonson5,97763.48%
|
|Bernice Luce1,84119.55%
|
|Doug Hart7477.93%
|
|
|
|Harold Kenney (C.o.R.)5856.23%Robert (Bob) Hodgins (Ind.)2402.55%|||
|Halvar C. Jonson
|-
|Red Deer-North|||
|Stockwell Day5,40255.44%
|
|Tony Connelly2,88829.64%
|
|Linda Kaiser-Putzenberger7627.82%
|
|Michael Roth5595.74%
|
|Katherine Fisher (Nat. Law)1041.07%|||
|Stockwell Day
|-
|Red Deer-South|||
|Victor Doerksen5,66346.42%
|
|Don Sinclair4,87940.00%
|
|Malcolm Reville6395.24%
|
|Randy Thorsteinson8827.23%
|
|Ken Arnold (Nat. Law)1160.95%|||
|John Oldring
|-
|Redwater
|
|Steve Zarusky4,58236.55%|||
|Nicholas Taylor6,42951.29%
|
|Robert J. Tomkins1,30610.42%
|
|
|
|Geoff Toane (Nat. Law)1961.56%|||
|
|-
|Rocky Mountain House|||
|Ty Lund5,19255.69%
|
|Roxanne V. Prior1,18112.67%
|
|Drew Ludington6046.48%
|
|Lavern J. Ahlstrom2,33024.99%
|
||||
|Ty Lund
|-
|Sherwood Park
|
|Doug Fulford6,70440.31%|||
|Bruce Collingwood7,79846.89%
|
|Jim Gurnett1,95511.76%
|
|
|
|Lorne Hoff (Nat. Law)1470.88%|||
|Peter Elzinga
|-
|Spruce Grove-Sturgeon-St. Albert
|
|Norm Kluthe4,42839.53%|||
|Colleen Soetaert5,81151.87%
|
|Steve Jacobs8137.26%
|
|
|
|Randy T. Fritz (Nat. Law)1321.18%|||
|
|-
|St. Albert
|
|Dick Fowler5,74640.27%|||
|Len Bracko7,26750.94%
|
|John Booth1,0317.23%
|
|
|
|Gordon C. Rever (Nat. Law)1991.39%|||
|Dick Fowler
|-
|Stony Plain|||
|Stan Woloshyn4,85541.27%
|
|Albert Schatzke4,60739.16%
|
|Laurence Johnson1,48112.59%
|
|Gary Morton6745.73%
|
|Lois Burger (Nat. Law)1331.13%|||
|Stan Woloshyn
|-
|Taber-Warner|||
|Ron Hierath5,54459.72%
|
|Doug Blatter2,72329.33%
|
|Charlie Bryant4334.66%
|
|Ken Rose5646.07%
|
||||
|Robert Bogle
|-
|Three Hills-Airdrie|||
|Carol Louise Haley5,66651.09%
|
|Don MacDonald3,78334.11%
|
|Gordon Twigg5534.99%
|
|Peter Smits5174.66%
|
|George Shenton (Alliance)4243.83Lawrence Lein (C.o.R.)1181.07%
||
|
|-
|Vegreville-Viking|||
|Ed Stelmach5,54040.98%
|
|Jerry Wilde3,79728.09%
|
|Derek Fox4,15030.70%
|
|
|
||||
|
|-
|Vermilion-Lloydminster|||
|Steve West5,52452.13%
|
|Greg Michaud4,29540.53%
|
|Grant Bergman7447.02%
|
|
|
||||
|
|-
|Wainwright|||
|Robert A. (Butch) Fischer5,29454.71%
|
|Evangeline Forcier1,93319.98%
|
|Tom A. Samuel6746.96%
|
|Dale Trefz1,76018.19%
|
||||
|Robert A. (Butch) Fischer
|-
|West Yellowhead
|
|Fiona Fowler Cleary3,10132.20%|||
|Duco Van Binsbergen3,56236.99%
|
|Jerry J. Doyle2,24323.29%
|
|Garry M. Klewchuk5826.04%
|
|Mario Houle (Green)1201.25%
||
|Jerry J. Doyle
|-
|Wetaskiwin-Camrose|||
|Ken Rostad6,29745.93%
|
|Bob Prestage4,96236.19%
|
|Bruce Hinkley1,59711.65%
|
|Henry Neumann8296.05%
|
||||
|
|-
|Whitecourt-Ste. Anne|||
|Peter Trynchy5,60048.11%
|
|Jurgen Preugschas4,31037.03%
|
|Connie Oskoboiny9127.84%
|
|Earle Cunningham5704.90%
|
|Walter Bliznicenko (Ind.)2181.87%|||
|
|-
|}

See also
List of Alberta political parties

References

Further reading 
 
 

1993 elections in Canada
1993
General election
June 1993 events in Canada